Black Cherry is the second studio album by English electronic music duo Goldfrapp, released on 23 April 2003 by Mute Records. It marked a departure from the ambient sound of their debut album, Felt Mountain (2000), incorporating glam rock and synth-pop music; inspirations were Spanish disco group Baccara and Swedish techno artist Håkan Lidbo. The album was met with positive reviews, with many critics complimenting its blend of retro and modern electropop music.

The album debuted at number 19 on the UK Albums Chart and has been certified platinum by the British Phonographic Industry (BPI). As of May 2005, it had sold nearly 500,000 copies worldwide. Black Cherry yielded four singles, including "Strict Machine", which reached number 20 on the UK Singles Chart. It earned the band a nomination for Best British Dance Act at the 2004 Brit Awards. The album was supported by the Black Cherry Tour (2003–2004).

Recording and production
The duo wrote three songs while touring in support of their debut album Felt Mountain, but decided to take their work in a different direction with more rhythmic music. Goldfrapp chose to record in a studio in a Bohemian area of Bath, England, because they needed a place to place their equipment and start working. The band began working on the album in January 2002 with a list of songs they wanted to try to record, such as a disco song with only string instruments. The studio's walls were covered in neon lights and Alison Goldfrapp used them to write down her song ideas. They recorded early demos and worked on pre-production using a Yamaha 02R digital mixing console. Goldfrapp held jam sessions with Mark Linkous and Adrian Utley and, after they built momentum writing the album, decided not to move to another studio.

The album cover is a collage made by Mat Maitland of photographs taken by Polly Borland featuring Alison with two wolves. Artwork in the liner notes also has a wolf motif, including women with wolf heads. Goldfrapp explained that the wolves are a representation of might and mysticism and that she was "interested in the idea of metamorphosis and humans wanting to be like animals and animals wanting to be like humans."

Composition
After touring in support of Felt Mountain, Alison stated that she felt performing slow torch songs "really claustrophobic". During their jam sessions, improvisation became a major part of the group's approach to recording Black Cherry. The album focuses more heavily on dance music and glam rock-inspired synthesisers than its predecessor, and is influenced by Spanish disco group Baccara and Swedish techno artist Håkan Lidbo. Goldfrapp commented that the album differs from Felt Mountain because the band "wanted to put more kind of 'oomph' in it." She stated that the lyrics are "a lot more direct and…less ambiguous." The songs on Black Cherry are more forthright in describing sexuality than those on Felt Mountain.

Critical reception

Black Cherry received generally positive reviews from music critics. At Metacritic, which assigns a normalised rating out of 100 to reviews from mainstream publications, the album received an average score of 72, based on 22 reviews. Uncut praised the change in the duo's musical direction, concluding, "I doubt there'll be many better albums released this year." Alexis Petridis of The Guardian called the album "laudable, challenging and immensely enjoyable". Sal Cinquemani of Slant Magazine opined, "Whether it be soothing techno-ballads [...] or custom-made clubs tracks [...], Goldfrapp know how to draw you in and, more importantly, hook you." Rolling Stones Pat Blashill noted that "[t]ons of bands imitate the sounds of the early Eighties, but Goldfrapp use New Wave as a way to evoke a long history of shiny Euro-lounge music." Spin commented that on Black Cherry, the duo "downplay the 'cinematic' strings in favor of buzzing live-wire synths. And singer Alison Goldfrapp still wails like Kate Bush haunting a fog-soaked moor." Mojo praised the album as "lucid and ambiguous... beautifully schizophrenic and poised on the edge of ruin".

Dorian Lynskey of Blender wrote, "Although a few tracks retain Felt Mountains eerie beauty, Black Cherrys natural habitat is less supper club than strip club, and Goldfrapp sound right at home." Andy Hermann of PopMatters viewed Black Cherry as "a weird, edgy album, the work of two doggedly maverick talents chasing their muses wherever they take them". Wes May of About.com dubbed it a "rare electronica album of warmth and depth" and "the ultimate chillout pleasure". Drowned in Sounds Gen Williams expressed that the album's "crystalline, neon-edged beauty, its pulsing army of beats and Alison's lush, lethargically versatile vocals, swinging between sultry and seraphic throughout, make it—for now at least—a largely satisfying record that indicates imminent and deserved success for Goldfrapp." Q deemed the album "thoroughly likeable" despite its "inconsistency". In a mixed review, Heather Phares of AllMusic commended Goldfrapp for their "artistic risk-taking", but felt that the album "sounds unbalanced, swinging between delicate, deceptively icy ballads and heavier, dance-inspired numbers without finding much of a happy medium between them." Michael Idov of Pitchfork criticised the duo's switch to electro music, while describing Black Cherry as "a soundtrack to excruciatingly banal seduction". Jonah Weiner of Entertainment Weekly panned the album's slower tracks as "boring dirges and space-age Muzak".

PopMatters included the album on its list of the Top 50 Albums of 2003, ranking it at number 46. It was listed at number 33 on Drowned in Sounds list of the Top 75 Albums of 2003. Black Cherry earned Goldfrapp a nomination for Best British Dance Act at the 2004 Brit Awards, but they lost to Basement Jaxx.

Commercial performance
Black Cherry debuted at number 19 on the UK Albums Chart, selling 14,859 copies in its first week. The album had sold 256,703 copies in the United Kingdom as of August 2005. Later that month, on 26 August 2005, Black Cherry was certified platinum by the British Phonographic Industry (BPI), denoting shipments in excess of 300,000 copies in the UK. The album reached the top 30 in Germany, Ireland, Norway and Portugal, and the top 50 in Belgium, France and Switzerland.

Black Cherry became Goldfrapp's first album to chart in the United States, reaching number four on the Top Electronic Albums chart and number 27 on the Top Independent Albums chart. By August 2006, it had sold 52,000 copies in the US. The album had sold nearly 500,000 copies worldwide as of May 2005.

Track listing

Personnel
Credits adapted from the liner notes of Black Cherry.

Goldfrapp
 Alison Goldfrapp – vocals, arrangements, synths
 Will Gregory – arrangements, synths

Additional musicians
 Charlie Jones – bass 
 Damon Reece – drums 
 Rowan Oliver – drums, percussion ; additional drum programming 
 Adrian Utley – guitar, bass 
 Mark Linkous – Casio 
 Andy Davis – guitar 
 Nick Batt – additional programming, synths
 Nick Ingman – string orchestration, string conducting

Technical
 Alison Goldfrapp – recording, production ; mixing 
 Will Gregory – recording, production ; mixing 
 Nick Batt – recording
 Bruno Ellingham – Pro Tools editing
 Steve Orchard – string recording, string submixing
 Tom Elmhirst – mixing
 David Bascombe – mixing 
 Mike Marsh – mastering

Artwork
 Alison Goldfrapp – art direction, design
 Big Active – art direction, design, illustrations, type
 Polly Borland – photography

Charts

Weekly charts

Year-end charts

Certifications and sales

Release history

References

2003 albums
Electroclash albums
Goldfrapp albums
Mute Records albums